

Auxiliary Bishops
Stanisław Dzedziński (1568-1573)

See also
Goswin (bishop of Poznań)
Archdiocese of Poznań
Archcathedral Basilica of St. Peter and St. Paul, Poznań

Notes

References
Official site of Archbishopric of Poznań
 Regesta Imperii (Papstregesten 911-1024 and Papstregesten 1024–1058)
 Paul Fridolin Kehr, Das Erzbistum Magdeburg und die erste Organisation der Christlichen Kirche in Polen, Abhandlungen der Königlich preussischen Akademie der Wissenschaften, 1920
 Władysław Abraham, Organizacja Kościoła w Polsce do połowy wieku XII, Lwów 1890
 Stanisław Karwowski, Najstarsi Długoszowi biskupi poznańscy wobec krytyki, Roczniki Towarzystwa Przyjaciół Nauk Poznańskiego T.35, Poznań 1909
 Stanisław Karwowski, Biskupi poznańscy z XII i początku XIII wieku, Roczniki Towarzystwa Przyjaciół Nauk Poznańskiego T.37, Poznań 1911
 Stanisław Karwowski, Biskupi poznańscy z drugiej połowy XIII wieku, Roczniki Towarzystwa Przyjaciół Nauk Poznańskiego T.43, Poznań 1915
 Annales Lubinensis in: Monumenta Poloniae Historica = Pomniki dziejowe Polski. T. 5, p. 866 ff.
 T. Wojciechowski, Szkice Historyczne XI wieku, Kraków 1904
 KODEKS DYPLOMATYCZNY WIELKOPOLSKI. TOM I.
 Karol Maleczyński: Studia nad dokumentem polskim, Wrocław 1971
 Wojciech Kętrzyński: Studyja nad dokumentami XII wieku, Roczniki Akademii Umiejętności, Lwów 1891, pp. 201–319
Jacek Maciejewski: Episkopat polski doby dzielnicowej, 1180–1320, Tow. Nauk. Societas Vistulana, 2003
Tadeusz Wasilewski: Kościół monarszy w X-XII wieku i jego zwierzchnik biskup polski, Kwartalnik historyczny, Tom 92, 1985

 
Lists of Polish people by occupation
Poznan
Poland religion-related lists